Wola Gułowska is a village in the administrative district of Gmina Adamów, within Łuków County, Lublin Voivodeship, in eastern Poland. It has a population of 328.

Wola Gułowska is located on the  river, a small tributary of the Tyśmienica river. The valley of the  river is a notable geographical feature of the village. It is located on the edge of the  upland, near the  plain. The village has a baroque Church of the Visitation and a museum of the Battle of Kock

History
Historically, Wola Gułowska belongs to the Stężyca Land in the Sandomierz Voivodeship. The oldest reference to Wola Gułowska is from 1508 when it was mentioned in a record next to Gułów. Records show that in 1509, along with Adamów, it belonged to the Wojcieszków parish. In 1545 Hieronim Rusiecki, the Sandomierz Standard-bearer, built a wooden chapel and paid for the upkeep of a priest in the village. In 1633 Ludwik Krasiński, heir to the local property, decided to found a Carmelite monastery and build a new church next to the old wooden chapel. The construction was completed and the church was consecrated in 1782. On 11 April 1869 the church was made the seat of a new parish.

From 3 to 5 October 1939 Wola Gułowska was the site of one of the smaller battles fought during the Battle of Kock. Polish soldiers fought against German troops near the village's cemetery and a local airfield. After the war a shrine and a museum dedicated to the battle were erected in the village. Between the years 1975 and 1998 the area administratively belonged to the Siedlce Voivodeship.

References

External links
 

Villages in Łuków County